Rivula dimorpha is a moth of the  family Noctuidae. It is found in the Seychelles on Mahé and Silhouette islands and in La Réunion.

It has a wingspan of 18mm.

References

Rivulinae
Moths described in 1912
Moths of Seychelles
Moths of Réunion